Vusal Garaev (born 1986) is an Azerbaijani football forward playing for Turan in the Azerbaijan First Division.

Career statistics

References

External links 
http://www.futbol-agent.com/profi/nap_garayevvusal.htm

1986 births
Living people
Azerbaijani footballers
Gabala FC players
Ravan Baku FC players
Association football forwards